Bhalevadivi Basu is a 2001 Telugu-language action comedy film directed by P. A. Arun Prasad. It stars Nandamuri Balakrishna, Anjala Zhaveri, Shilpa Shetty  and the music was composed by Mani Sharma. The film was produced by Sivalenka Krishna Prasad under the Sridevi Movies banner. Bhalevadivi Basu created a lot of hype since it followed the stupendous hit of Narasimha Naidu and was intended to be an image make-over for Nandamuri Balakrishna from action hero to family hero. The film was not commercially successful.

Plot
Sagaris a forest ranger. Swetha is Sagar's boss. Nemali is a tribal woman. The first half of the film revolves around how Nemali and Swetha try to impress Sagar, but a mysterious woman appears and reveals that the forest ranger's name is not Sagar and he is an impostor. The second half of the film starts with the impostor relating in the flashback that his real name is Prabhu and he is a petty thief who gets to know a person called Sagar, an intelligent unemployed graduate. Sagar has a mother and sister, who made sacrifices to enable him to graduate. Sagar, now a forest ranger becomes close to Prabhu. When Sagar's mother falls ill and she needs one lakh as the medical fee, Prabhu arranges to get the money by giving false testimony in court, but this misfires and ends in him being imprisoned for life. But he escapes from the police and enters the forest where he sees Sagar severely injured in a car accident. Sagar asks Prabhu to take care of his mother and sister. Since nobody knows the identity of the real Sagar, Prabhu impersonates him as a forest ranger where he tries to improve the life of tribal people and ensures that poachers and animal killers are kept at bay. At the same time, pretending to be Sagar he keeps in touch with the Sagar's family. The rest of the story revolves around how the false Sagar arranges the marriage of Sagar's sister before fighting in a routine climax.

Cast

 Nandamuri Balakrishna as Sagar/Prabhu
 Shilpa Shetty as Swetha
 Anjala Zaveri as Nemali
 Venkat as Sagar
 Prakash Raj as Benerjee
 Brahmanandam as Cook Bhima Rao 
 Sumitra as Lalithamma (Sagar's mother)
 Sudhakar as Balu / Jaggu
 Mallikarjuna Rao as Ammi Raju
 Bhupinder Singh as Anji
 M. Balayya as Judge
 Raghunatha Reddy as Judge
 Sivaji Raja as Kamal 
 Kallu Chidambaram as Manmadha Rao 
 Gundu Hanumantha Rao 
 Gautam Raju
 Satya Prakash as C. I. Bhushan
 Juttu Narasimham as Kodi Rammurthy
 Swathi as Sunitha
 Vichitra as Pushpa
 Indu Anand

Soundtrack

Music composed by Mani Sharma. Music released on Supreme Music Company.

References

External links 
 

2001 films
Films scored by Mani Sharma
2000s Telugu-language films
Films directed by P. A. Arun Prasad